Julia Agrippina (6 November AD 15 – 23 March AD 59), also referred to as Agrippina the Younger, was Roman empress from 49 to 54 AD, the fourth wife and niece of Emperor Claudius, and the mother of Nero.

Agrippina was one of the most prominent women in the Julio-Claudian dynasty. She was the daughter of the Roman general Germanicus and Agrippina the Elder, granddaughter of Augustus (the first Roman emperor). Her father, Germanicus, was the nephew and heir apparent of the second emperor, Tiberius. Agrippina's brother Caligula became emperor in 37 AD. After Caligula was assassinated in 41 AD, Germanicus' brother Claudius took the throne. Agrippina married Claudius in 49 AD.

Agrippina functioned as a behind-the-scenes advisor in the affairs of the Roman state via powerful political ties. She maneuvered her son Nero into the line of succession. Claudius became aware of her plotting, but died in 54; it was rumoured that Agrippina poisoned him. Agrippina exerted a commanding influence in the early years of Nero's reign, but in 59 she was killed. Both ancient and modern sources describe Agrippina's personality as ruthless, ambitious, violent and domineering. Physically, she was a beautiful and reputable woman; according to Pliny the Elder, she had a double canine in her upper right jaw, a sign of good fortune.

Family

Agrippina was the first daughter and fourth living child of Agrippina the Elder and Germanicus. She had three elder brothers, Nero Caesar, Drusus Caesar, and the future emperor Caligula, and two younger sisters, Julia Drusilla and Julia Livilla. Agrippina's two eldest brothers and her mother were victims of the intrigues of the Praetorian Prefect Lucius Aelius Sejanus.

She was the namesake of her mother. Agrippina the Elder was remembered as a modest and heroic matron, who was the second daughter and fourth child of Julia the Elder and the statesman Marcus Vipsanius Agrippa. The father of Julia the Elder was the emperor Augustus, and Julia was his only natural child from his second marriage to Scribonia, who had close blood relations with Pompey the Great and Lucius Cornelius Sulla.

Germanicus, Agrippina's father, was a very popular general and politician. His mother was Antonia Minor and his father was the general Nero Claudius Drusus. He was Antonia Minor's first child. Germanicus had two younger siblings; a sister, named Livilla, and a brother, the future emperor Claudius. Claudius was Agrippina's paternal uncle and third husband.

Antonia Minor was a daughter to Octavia the Younger by her second marriage to triumvir Mark Antony, and Octavia was the second eldest sister and full-blooded sister of Augustus. Germanicus' father, Drusus the Elder, was the second son of the Empress Livia Drusilla by her first marriage to praetor Tiberius Nero, and was the emperor Tiberius's younger brother and Augustus's stepson. 

In the year 9, Augustus ordered and forced Tiberius to adopt Germanicus, who happened to be Tiberius's nephew, as his son and heir. Germanicus was a favourite of his great-uncle Augustus, who hoped that Germanicus would succeed his uncle Tiberius, who was Augustus's own adopted son and heir. This in turn meant that Tiberius was also Agrippina's adoptive grandfather in addition to her paternal great-uncle.

Birth and early life

Agrippina was born on 6 November in AD 15, or possibly 14, at Oppidum Ubiorum, a Roman outpost on the Rhine River located in present-day Cologne, Germany. A second sister Julia Drusilla was born on 16 September 16, also in Germany.  

As a small child, Agrippina travelled with her parents throughout Germany (15–16) until she and her siblings (apart from Caligula) returned to Rome to live with and be raised by their maternal grandmother Antonia.  Her parents departed for Syria in 18 to conduct official duties, and, according to Tacitus, the third and youngest sister was born en route on the island of Lesbos, namely Julia Livilla, probably on March 18. In October of AD 19, Germanicus died suddenly in Antioch (modern Antakya, Turkey).

Germanicus' death caused much public grief in Rome, and gave rise to rumours that he had been murdered by Gnaeus Calpurnius Piso and Munatia Plancina on the orders of Tiberius, as his widow Agrippina the Elder returned to Rome with his ashes. Agrippina the Younger was thereafter supervised by her mother, her paternal grandmother Antonia Minor, and her great-grandmother, Livia, all of them notable, influential, and powerful figures from whom she learnt how to survive. She lived on the Palatine Hill in Rome. Her great-uncle Tiberius had already become emperor and the head of the family after the death of Augustus in 14.

Marriage to Gnaeus Domitius Ahenobarbus

After her thirteenth birthday in 28, Tiberius arranged for Agrippina to marry her paternal first cousin once removed Gnaeus Domitius Ahenobarbus and ordered the marriage to be celebrated in Rome. Domitius came from a distinguished family of consular rank. Through his mother Antonia Major, Domitius was a great nephew of Augustus, first cousin to Claudius, and first cousin once removed to Agrippina and Caligula. He had two sisters; Domitia Lepida the Elder and Domitia Lepida the Younger. Domitia Lepida the Younger was the mother of the Empress Valeria Messalina.

Antonia Major was the elder sister to Antonia Minor, and the first daughter of Octavia Minor and Mark Antony. According to Suetonius, Domitius was a wealthy man with a despicable and dishonest character, who, according to Suetonius, was "a man who was in every aspect of his life detestable" and served as consul in 32. Agrippina and Domitius lived between Antium and Rome. Not much is known about the relationship between them.

Reign of Caligula

Public role and political intrigues 

Tiberius died on March 16, AD 37, and Agrippina's only surviving brother, Caligula, became the new emperor. Being the emperor's sister gave Agrippina some influence.

Agrippina and her younger sisters Julia Drusilla and Julia Livilla received various honours from their brother, which included but were not limited to

 receiving the rights of the Vestal Virgins, such as the freedom to view public games from the upper seats in the stadium;
 being honoured with a new type of coinage, depicting images of Caligula and his sisters on opposite faces;
 having their names added to motions, including loyalty oaths (e.g., "I will not value my life or that of my children less highly than I do the safety of the Emperor and his sisters") and consular motions (e.g., "Good fortune attend to the Emperor and his sisters)".

Around the time that Tiberius died, Agrippina had become pregnant. Domitius had acknowledged the paternity of the child. On December 15, AD 37, in the early morning, in Antium, Agrippina gave birth to a son. Agrippina and Domitius named their son Lucius Domitius Ahenobarbus, after Domitius' recently deceased father. This child would grow up to become the emperor Nero. Nero was Agrippina's only natural child. Suetonius states that Domitius was congratulated by friends on the birth of his son, whereupon he replied "I don't think anything produced by me and Agrippina could possibly be good for the state or the people".

Caligula and his sisters were accused of having incestuous relationships. On June 10, AD 38, Drusilla died, possibly of a fever, rampant in Rome at the time. He was particularly fond of Drusilla, claiming to treat her as he would his own wife, even though Drusilla had a husband. Following her death Caligula showed no special love or respect toward the surviving sisters and was said to have gone insane.

In 39, Agrippina and Livilla, with their maternal cousin, Drusilla's widower Marcus Aemilius Lepidus, were involved in a failed plot to murder Caligula, a plot known as the Plot of the Three Daggers, which was to make Lepidus the new emperor. Lepidus, Agrippina and Livilla were accused of being lovers. Not much is known concerning this plot and the reasons behind it. At the trial of Lepidus, Caligula felt no compunction about denouncing them as adulteresses, producing handwritten letters discussing how they were going to kill him. The three were found guilty as accessories to the crime.

Exile 
Lepidus was executed. According to the fragmentary inscriptions of the Arval Brethren, Agrippina was forced to carry the urn of Lepidus' ashes back to Rome. Agrippina and Livilla were exiled by their brother to the Pontine Islands. Caligula sold their furniture, jewellery, slaves and freedmen.  In January of AD 40, Domitius died of edema (dropsy) at Pyrgi. Lucius had gone to live with his second paternal aunt Domitia Lepida the Younger after Caligula had taken his inheritance away from him.

Caligula, his wife Milonia Caesonia and their daughter Julia Drusilla were murdered on January 24, 41. Agrippina's paternal uncle, Claudius, brother of her father Germanicus, became the new Roman emperor.

Reign of Claudius

Return from exile

Claudius lifted the exiles of Agrippina and Livilla. Livilla returned to her husband, while Agrippina was reunited with her estranged son. After the death of her first husband, Agrippina tried to make shameless advances to the future emperor Galba, who showed no interest in her and was devoted to his wife Aemilia Lepida. On one occasion, Galba's mother-in-law gave Agrippina a public reprimand and a slap in the face before a whole bevy of married women.

Claudius had Lucius' inheritance reinstated. Lucius became more wealthy despite his youth shortly after Gaius Sallustius Crispus Passienus divorced Lucius' aunt, Domitia Lepida the Elder (Lucius' first paternal aunt) so that Crispus could marry Agrippina. They married, and Crispus  became a step-father to Lucius. Crispus was a prominent, influential, witty, wealthy and powerful man, who served twice as consul. He was the adopted grandson and biological great-great-nephew of the historian Sallust. Little is known on their relationship, but Crispus soon died and left his estate to Nero.

In the first years of Claudius' reign, Claudius was married to the infamous Empress Valeria Messalina. Although Agrippina was very influential, she kept a very low profile and stayed away from the imperial palace and the court of the emperor. Messalina was Agrippina's second paternal cousin. Among the victims of Messalina's intrigues were Agrippina's surviving sister Livilla, who was charged with having adultery with Seneca the Younger. Seneca was later called back from exile to be a tutor to Nero.

Messalina considered Agrippina's son a threat to her son's position and sent assassins to strangle Lucius during his siesta. The assassins left after they saw a snake beneath Lucius' pillow, considering it as bad omen. It was, however, only a sloughed-off snake-skin in his bed, near his pillow. By Agrippina's order, the serpent's skin was enclosed in a bracelet that the young Nero wore on his right arm.

In 47, Crispus died, and at his funeral, the rumour spread around that Agrippina poisoned Crispus to gain his estate. After being widowed a second time, Agrippina was left very wealthy. Later that year at the Secular Games, at the performance of the Troy Pageant, Messalina attended the event with her son Britannicus. Agrippina was also present with Lucius. Agrippina and Lucius received greater applause from the audience than Messalina and Britannicus did. Many people began to show pity and sympathy to Agrippina, due to the unfortunate circumstances in her life.

Marriage to Claudius
After Messalina was executed in 48 for conspiring with Gaius Silius to overthrow her husband, Claudius considered marrying for the fourth time. Around this time, Agrippina became the mistress to one of Claudius' advisers, the Greek freedman, Marcus Antonius Pallas. At that time Claudius' advisers were discussing which noblewoman Claudius should marry. Claudius had a reputation that he was easily persuaded. In more recent times, it has been suggested that the Senate may have pushed for the marriage between Agrippina and Claudius to end the feud between the Julian and Claudian branches. This feud dated back to Agrippina's mother's actions against Tiberius after the death of Germanicus, actions which Tiberius had gladly punished.

Claudius made references to her in his speeches: "my daughter and foster child, born and bred, in my lap, so to speak". When Claudius decided to marry her, he persuaded a group of senators that the marriage should be arranged in the public interest. In Roman society, an uncle (Claudius) marrying his niece (Agrippina) was considered incestuous and immoral.

Agrippina and Claudius married on New Year's Day, 49. This marriage caused widespread disapproval. This may have been a part of Agrippina's plan to make her son Lucius the new emperor. Her marriage to Claudius was not based on love, but on power. She quickly eliminated her rival Lollia Paulina. Shortly after marrying Claudius, Agrippina persuaded the emperor to charge Paulina with black magic. Claudius stipulated that Paulina did not receive a hearing and her property was confiscated.  She left Italy, but Agrippina was unsatisfied. Allegedly on Agrippina's orders, Paulina committed suicide.

In the months leading up to her marriage to Claudius, Agrippina's maternal second cousin, the praetor Lucius Junius Silanus Torquatus, was betrothed to Claudius' daughter Claudia Octavia. This betrothal was broken off in 48, when Agrippina, scheming with the consul Lucius Vitellius the Elder, the father of the future emperor Aulus Vitellius, falsely accused Silanus of incest with his sister Junia Calvina. Agrippina did this hoping to secure a marriage between Octavia and her son. Consequently, Claudius broke off the engagement and forced Silanus to resign from public office.

Silanus committed suicide on the day that Agrippina married her uncle, and Calvina was exiled from Italy in early 49. Calvina was called back from exile after the death of Agrippina. Towards the end of 54, Agrippina would order the murder of Silanus' eldest brother Marcus Junius Silanus Torquatus without Nero's knowledge, so that he would not seek revenge against her over his brother's death.

Empress of Rome

On the day that Agrippina married her uncle Claudius as her third husband/his fourth wife, she became empress. She also was a stepmother to Claudia Antonia, Claudius' daughter and only child from his second marriage to Aelia Paetina, and to the young Claudia Octavia and Britannicus, Claudius' children with Valeria Messalina. Agrippina removed or eliminated anyone from the palace or the imperial court who she thought was loyal and dedicated to the memory of the late Messalina. She also eliminated or removed anyone who she considered was a potential threat to her position and the future of her son, one of her victims being Lucius' second paternal aunt and Messalina's mother Domitia Lepida the Younger.

Griffin describes how Agrippina "had achieved this dominant position for her son and herself by a web of political alliances," which included Claudius chief secretary and bookkeeper Pallas, his doctor Xenophon, and Afranius Burrus, the head of the Praetorian Guard (the imperial bodyguard), who owed his promotion to Agrippina. Neither ancient nor modern historians of Rome have doubted that Agrippina had her eye on securing the throne for Nero from the very day of the marriage—if not earlier. Dio Cassius observation seems to bear that out: "As soon as Agrippina had come to live in the palace she gained complete control over Claudius."

In 49, Agrippina was seated on a dais at a parade of captives when their leader the Celtic King Caratacus bowed before her with the same homage and gratitude as he accorded the emperor. In 50, Agrippina was granted the honorific title of Augusta. She was only the third Roman woman (Livia Drusilla and Antonia Minor received this title) and only the second living Roman woman (the first being Livia) to receive this title.

In her capacity as Augusta, Agrippina quickly became a trusted advisor to Claudius, and by AD 54, she exerted a considerable influence over the decisions of the emperor. Statues of her were erected in many cities across the Empire, her face appeared on coins, and in the Senate, her followers were advanced with public offices and governorships. However this privileged position caused resentment among the senatorial class and the imperial family.

She went to a place outside the imperial court and listened to the Senate from behind the scenes, and even Claudius allowed her to be a separate court and decide on empire matters. Agrippina even signed government documents and officially dealt with foreign ambassadors. She also claimed auctoritas (power of commanding) and Autokrateira (self-ruler as empress) in front of the Senate, the people and the army.

Also that year, Claudius had founded a Roman colony and called the colony Colonia Claudia Ara Agrippinensis or Agrippinensium, today known as Cologne, after Agrippina who was born there. This colony was the only Roman colony to be named after a Roman woman. In 51, she was given a carpentum which she used. A carpentum was a sort of ceremonial carriage usually reserved for priests, such as the Vestal Virgins, and sacred statues. That same year she appointed Sextus Afranius Burrus as the head of the Praetorian Guard, replacing the previous head of the Praetorian Guard, Rufrius Crispinus.

She assisted Claudius in administering the empire and became very wealthy and powerful. Ancient sources claim that Agrippina successfully influenced Claudius into adopting her son and making him his successor. Lucius Domitius Ahenobarbus was adopted by his great maternal uncle and stepfather in 50. Lucius' name was changed to Nero Claudius Caesar Drusus Germanicus and he became Claudius's adopted son, heir and recognised successor. Agrippina and Claudius betrothed Nero to his step sister Claudia Octavia, and Agrippina arranged to have Seneca the Younger return from exile to tutor the future emperor. Claudius chose to adopt Nero because of his Julian and Claudian lineage.

Agrippina deprived Britannicus of his heritage and further isolated him from his father and succession for the throne in every way possible. For instance, in 51, Agrippina ordered the execution of Britannicus' tutor Sosibius because he had confronted her and was outraged by Claudius' adoption of Nero and his choice of Nero as successor, instead of choosing his own son Britannicus.

Nero and Octavia were married on June 9, 53. Claudius later repented of marrying Agrippina and adopting Nero, began to favour Britannicus, and started preparing him for the throne. His actions allegedly gave Agrippina a motive to eliminate Claudius. The ancient sources say she poisoned Claudius on October 13, 54 (a Sunday) with a plate of deadly mushrooms at a banquet, thus enabling Nero to quickly take the throne as emperor. Accounts vary wildly with regard to this private incident and according to more modern sources, it is possible that Claudius died of natural causes; Claudius was 63 years old. In the aftermath of Claudius's death, Agrippina, who initially kept the death secret, tried to consolidate power, and immediately ordered that the palace and the capital be sealed. All the gates were blockaded and exit of the capital forbidden and she introduced Nero first to the soldiers and then to the senators as emperor.

Reign of Nero

Relationship with Nero

Nero was raised to emperor and Agrippina was named a priestess of the cult of the deified Claudius. She now attempted to use her son's youth to participate in the rule of the Roman Empire. She enjoyed imperial prerogatives: holding court with the emperor by her side, being allowed to visit senate meetings from behind a curtain, and appearing as a partner to her son in the royal coins and statues. The historian Tacitus depicts her as attempting a diarchy with her son when she demanded that the Praetorian Guard pledge their loyalty to her. She was also said to have tried to participate in her son's meeting with Armenian ambassadors until Seneca and Burrus stopped her.

In year one of Nero's reign, Agrippina guided her 17-year-old son in his rule but started losing influence over Nero when he began to have an affair with the freed woman Claudia Acte, which Agrippina strongly disapproved of and violently scolded him for. Agrippina began to support Britannicus in her possible attempt to make him emperor, or to threaten Nero. The panicking emperor decided on whether to eliminate his mother or his step-brother. Soon, Nero had Britannicus secretly poisoned during his own banquet in February 55. The power struggle between Agrippina and her son had begun.

Agrippina between 56 and 58 became very watchful and had a critical eye over her son. In 56, Agrippina was forced out of the palace by her son to live in the imperial residence. However, some degree of Agrippina's influence over her son still lasted several more years, and they are considered the best years of Nero's reign. But their relationship grew more hostile and Nero gradually deprived his mother of honours and powers, and even removed her Roman and German bodyguards. Nero even threatened his mother that he would abdicate the throne and would go to live on the Greek Island of Rhodes, a place where Tiberius had lived after divorcing Julia the Elder. Pallas also was dismissed from the court. The fall of Pallas and the opposition of Burrus and Seneca to Agrippina contributed to her scaling down of authority. In mid-56, she was forced out of everyday and active participation in the governance of Rome.

While Agrippina lived in her residence or when she went on short visits to Rome, Nero sent people to annoy her. Although living in Misenum, she was always hailed as "Augusta", and  Agrippina and Nero would see each other on short visits. In late 58, Agrippina and a group of soldiers and senators were accused of attempting to overthrow Nero, and it was said they planned to move with Gaius Rubellius Plautus. In addition, she revealed Nero's relationship with Poppaea Sabina.

Death and aftermath
The circumstances that surround Agrippina's death are uncertain due to historical contradictions and anti-Nero bias. All surviving stories of Agrippina's death contradict themselves and each other, and are generally fantastical.

Tacitus's account
According to Tacitus, in 58, Nero became involved with the noble woman Poppaea Sabina. She taunted him for being a "mummy's boy." She also convinced him of the autonomy of any other emperor. With the reasoning that a divorce from Octavia and a marriage to Poppaea was not politically feasible with Agrippina alive, Nero decided to kill Agrippina. Yet, Nero did not marry Poppaea until 62, calling into question this motive.  Additionally, Suetonius reveals that Poppaea's husband, Otho, was not sent away by Nero until after Agrippina's death in 59, making it highly unlikely that already married Poppaea would be pressing Nero. Some modern historians theorise that Nero's decision to kill Agrippina was prompted by her plot to replace him with either Gaius Rubellius Plautus (Nero's maternal second cousin) or Britannicus (Claudius' biological son).

Tacitus claims that Nero considered poisoning or stabbing her, but felt these methods were too difficult and suspicious, so he settled on – after the advice of his former tutor Anicetus – building a self-sinking boat. Though aware of the plot, Agrippina embarked on this boat and was nearly crushed by a collapsing lead ceiling only to be saved by the side of a sofa breaking the ceiling's fall. Though the collapsing ceiling missed Agrippina, it crushed her attendant who was outside by the helm.

The boat failed to sink from the lead ceiling, so the crew then sank the boat, but Agrippina swam to shore. Her friend, Acerronia Polla, was attacked by oarsmen while still in the water, and was either bludgeoned to death or drowned, since she was exclaiming that she was Agrippina, with the intention of being saved. She did not know, however, that this was an assassination attempt, not a mere accident. Agrippina was met at the shore by crowds of admirers. News of Agrippina's survival reached Nero so he sent three assassins to kill her.

Suetonius's account
Suetonius says that Agrippina's "over-watchful" and "over-critical" eye that she kept over Nero drove him to murdering her. After months of attempting to humiliate her by depriving her of her power, honour, and bodyguards, he also expelled her from the Palatine, followed by the people he sent to "pester" her with lawsuits and "jeers and catcalls".

When he eventually turned to murder, he first tried poison, three times in fact. She prevented her death by taking the antidote in advance. Afterwards, he rigged up a machine in her room which would drop her ceiling tiles onto her as she slept, but she once again escaped her death after she received word of the plan. Nero's final plan was to get her in a boat which would collapse and sink.

He sent her a friendly letter asking to reconcile and inviting her to celebrate the Quinquatrus at Baiae with him. He arranged an "accidental" collision between her galley and one of his captains. When returning home, he offered her his collapsible boat, as opposed to her damaged galley.

The next day, Nero received word of her survival after the boat sank from her freedman Agermus. Panicking, Nero ordered a guard to "surreptitiously" drop a blade behind Agermus and Nero immediately had him arrested on account of attempted murder. Nero ordered the assassination of Agrippina. He made it look as if Agrippina had committed suicide after her plot to kill Nero had been uncovered.

Suetonius says that after Agrippina's death, Nero examined Agrippina's corpse and discussed her good and bad points. Nero also believed Agrippina to haunt him after her death.

Cassius Dio's account
The tale of Cassius Dio is also somewhat different. It starts again with Poppaea as the motive behind the murder. Nero designed a ship that would open at the bottom while at sea. Agrippina was put aboard and after the bottom of the ship opened up, she fell into the water. Agrippina swam to shore so Nero sent an assassin to kill her. Nero then claimed Agrippina had plotted to kill him and committed suicide. Her reputed last words, uttered as the assassin was about to strike, were "Smite my womb", the implication here being she wished to be destroyed first in that part of her body that had given birth to so "abominable a son."

Burial
After Agrippina's death, Nero viewed her corpse and commented how beautiful she was, according to some. Her body was cremated that night on a dining couch. At his mother's funeral, Nero was witless, speechless and rather scared. When the news spread that Agrippina had died, the Roman army, senate and various people sent him letters of congratulations that he had been saved from his mother's plots.

Aftermath
During the remainder of Nero's reign, Agrippina's grave was not covered or enclosed. Her household later on gave her a modest tomb in Misenum. Nero would have his mother's death on his conscience. He felt so guilty he would sometimes have nightmares about his mother. He even saw his mother's ghost and got Persian magicians to ask her for forgiveness. Years before she died, Agrippina had visited astrologers to ask about her son's future. The astrologers had rather accurately predicted that her son would become emperor and would kill her. She replied, "Let him kill me, provided he becomes emperor," according to Tacitus.

Agrippina's alleged victims 
 47
 Passienus Crispus: Agrippina's 2nd husband, poisoned (Suet.).
48
 Messalina: Because of the competition for the emperor's successor
 49
 Lollia Paulina: as she was a rival for Claudius' hand in marriage as proposed by the freedman Callistus (Tac. & Dio).
 Lucius Silanus: betrothed to Octavia, Claudius' daughter before his marriage of Agrippina. He committed suicide on their wedding day.
 Sosibius: Britannicus' tutor, executed for plotting against Nero.
 Calpurnia: banished (Tac.) and/or executed (Dio) because Claudius had commented on her beauty.
 53
 Statilius Taurus: forced to commit suicide because Agrippina wanted his gardens (Tac.).
 54
 Claudius: her husband, poisoned (Tac., Sen., Juv., Suet., Dio).
 Domitia Lepida: mother of Messalina, executed (Tac.).
 Marcus Junius Silanus: a potential rival to Nero, poisoned (Pliny, Tac., Dio).
 Cadius Rufus: executed on the charge of extortion.
 Tiberius Claudius Narcissus: Because of the competition with Agrippina.

Legacy and cultural references

Memoirs
Agrippina left memoirs of her life and the misfortunes of her family, which Tacitus used when writing his Annals, but they have not survived.

In music and literature 
She is remembered in De Mulieribus Claris, a collection of biographies of historical and mythological women by the Florentine author Giovanni Boccaccio, composed in 136162. It is notable as the first collection devoted exclusively to biographies of women in western literature.

Octavia, a Roman tragedy written during the Flavian period
Agrippina: Trauerspiel (1665), a German baroque tragedy by Daniel Casper von Lohenstein
G.F. Handel's 1709 opera Agrippina with a libretto by Vincenzo Grimani
Empress of Rome (1978), a novel by Robert DeMaria (Vineyard Press edition, 2001)
Agrippina is considered to be the founder of Cologne and is still symbolised there today by the robe of the virgin of the Cologne triumvirate. In the sculpture programme of the Cologne town hall tower, a figure by Heribert Calleen was dedicated to Agrippina on the ground floor.

In film, television, and radio 
 The 1911 Italian film Agrippina
I, Claudius (1976) played by Barbara Young (here called Agrippinilla).
Caligula (1979) and also Messalina, Messalina (1977) played by Lori Wagner.
Caligula and Messalina (1981) played by Françoise Blanchard.
A.D. (1985 miniseries) played by Ava Gardner.
Boudica (2003) played by Frances Barber.
Imperium: Nero (2005) played by Laura Morante.
Ancients Behaving Badly (2009), History Channel documentary. Episode Nero.
Roman Empire (2016), Netflix, played by Teressa Liane.
 Agrippina the Younger was portrayed by Betty Lou Gerson in the August 31, 1953, episode of the CBS radio program Crime Classics that was entitled "Your Loving Son, Nero." The episode chronicles the killing of Agrippina by her son Nero who was portrayed by William Conrad.
Mio Figlio Nerone  (1956) played by Gloria Swanson

Perspectives on Agrippina's personality

Ancient
Most ancient Roman sources are quite critical of Agrippina the Younger. Tacitus considered her vicious and had a strong disposition against her. Other sources are Suetonius and Cassius Dio.

Modern
  Girod, Virginie, Agrippine, sexe, crimes et pouvoir dans la Rome impériale , Paris, Tallandier, 2015, 300 p.
 Minaud, Gérard, Les vies de 12 femmes d'empereur romain – Devoirs, Intrigues & Voluptés , Paris, L'Harmattan, 2012, ch. 3,  La vie d'Agrippine, femme de Claude, p. 65-96.
 E. Groag, A. Stein, L. Petersen, Prosopographia Imperii Romani saeculi I, II et III, Berlin, 1933
 Scullard: A critical view of Agrippina, suggesting she was ambitious and unscrupulous and a depraved sexual psychopath. "Agrippina struck down a series of victims; no man or woman was safe if she suspected rivalry or desired their wealth."
 Ferrero: Sympathetic and understanding, suggesting Agrippina has been judged harshly by history. Suggesting her marriage to Claudius was to a weak emperor who was, because of his hesitations and terrors, a threat to the imperial authority and government. She saw it her duty to compensate for the innumerable deficiencies of her strange husband through her own intelligence and strength of will. Pages 212ff.; 276ff.
 Barrett: A reasonable view, comparing Scullard's criticisms to Ferrero's apologies. (See Barrett, Anthony A., Agrippina: Sex, Power and Politics in the Early Roman Empire, Yale University Press, New Haven, 1996.)
 Annelise Freisenbruch, The first ladies of Rome
 
 
 
 
 
 McDaniel, W. B. "Bauli the Scene of the Murder of Agrippina". The Classical Quarterly, Vol. 4, No. 2 (April 1910)
 Salmonson, Jessica Amanda. (1991) The Encyclopedia of Amazons. Paragon House. Pages 4–5.
 Donna Hurley, Agrippina the Younger (Wife of Claudius).
 L. Foubert, Agrippina. Keizerin van Rome, Leuven, 2006.
 Opera by G. F. Handel: Agrippina

See also
List of unsolved murders

Notes

References

Tacitus, Annales  xii.1–10, 64–69, xiv.1–9
Suetonius, De vita Caesarum – Claudius v.44 and Nero vi.5.3, 28.2, 34.1–4

15 births
59 deaths
1st-century executions
1st-century Roman empresses
Augustae
Children of Germanicus
Family of Nero
Female murder victims
Incest
Julii Caesares
Murdered Roman empresses
People from Cologne
Unsolved murders in Italy
Wives of Claudius